Chamuel may refer to:

Michelle Chamuel, American singer-songwriter
Camael, an angel in Judeo-Christian theology and angelology
Chamuel (wrestler), Mexican professional wrestler